Tony De Zorzi (born 28 August 1997) is a South African cricketer. He was included in the Northerns squad for the 2016 Africa T20 Cup. He made his Twenty20 (T20) debut for Northerns against Kenya on 16 September 2016. Prior to his T20 debut, he was named as captain of South Africa's squad for the 2016 Under-19 Cricket World Cup.

Career
He made his first-class debut for Northerns in the 2016–17 Sunfoil 3-Day Cup on 28 October 2016. He made his List A debut for Northerns in the 2016–17 CSA Provincial One-Day Challenge on 31 October 2016.

In August 2017, he was named in Pretoria Mavericks' squad for the first season of the T20 Global League. However, in October 2017, Cricket South Africa initially postponed the tournament until November 2018, with it being cancelled soon after.

In January 2018, he scored his first century in List A cricket, batting for Titans against Knights in the 2017–18 Momentum One Day Cup. In June 2018, he was named in the squad for the Titans team for the 2018–19 season. The following month, he was named as the captain of the Cricket South Africa Emerging Squad.

In September 2018, he was named in the Titans' squad for the 2018 Abu Dhabi T20 Trophy. In October 2018, he was named in Tshwane Spartans' squad for the first edition of the Mzansi Super League T20 tournament. In September 2019, he was named in the squad for the Tshwane Spartans team for the 2019 Mzansi Super League tournament.

In January 2020, in the 2019–20 CSA 4-Day Franchise Series, he scored his maiden double century in first-class cricket, with an unbeaten 213 runs against Cape Cobras. In April 2021, he was named in Western Province's squad, ahead of the 2021–22 cricket season in South Africa.

International career
In February 2023, he was selected in South Africa Test squad for the series against West Indies. He made his Test debut against West Indies on 28 February 2023. In March 2023, he was named in South Africa's One Day International (ODI) squad for their series against the West Indies. He made his ODI debut in the second ODI on 18 March 2023.

References

External links
 

1997 births
Living people
South African cricketers
Northerns cricketers
Titans cricketers
Tshwane Spartans cricketers
Place of birth missing (living people)